Martin Garcia (born October 23, 1984 in Veracruz, Mexico) is a Mexican jockey in American Thoroughbred horse racing based in Southern California.

Garcia emigrated to the United States in 2003 and went to work at a delicatessen in Pleasanton, California. The deli's owner, Teri Terry, introduced him to Mark Hanna, a former jockey, who helped him get started in horse racing as a stablehand and exercise rider. Garcia spent six months galloping horses before beginning to ride in races at Golden Gate Fields.

On August 17, 2005, in his third career ride, Garcia rode Wild Daydreamer to victory at the Bay Meadows Fair.

In 2006, he outranked Hall of Fame rider Russell Baze for leading jockey at Golden Gate Fields. Baze had previously dominated that circuit, and would reclaim his supremacy as soon at Garcia took his tack to Southern California. Garcia also won a riding title at Bay Meadows. In April 2006, Garcia relocated to southern California. At the Hollywood Park Racetrack Summer meet, he finished third behind Victor Espinoza and Patrick Valenzuela after riding 46 winning horses.

On May 15, 2010, Garcia rode the Bob Baffert trainee Lookin at Lucky to victory in the 135th running of the Preakness Stakes at Pimlico Race Course in Baltimore, Maryland. On August 1, 2010, he rode Lookin at Lucky to win the 43rd Haskell Invitational Handicap at Monmouth Park Racetrack in Oceanport, New Jersey.

On May 6, 2011, Garcia rode the Baffert-trained filly Plum Pretty to win the 137th Kentucky Oaks at Churchill Downs Racetrack in Kentucky.  On July 31 of that year, Garcia rallied from last on another Baffert trainee, Coil, to win his second Haskell Invitational Handicap.

Other top mounts for Garcia include Somethingaboutlaura, Get Funky, Sweeter Still, Sierra Sweetie, Briecat, Z Humor, Dance With Gable, and Strawberry Tart. Garcia also was the back up jockey for Game On Dude, three-time winner of the Santa Anita Handicap.

In 2014 he rode Bayern to a gate-to-wire victory in the Breeders' Cup Classic in a time under two minutes. That race has been subject of much debate due to a stewards' inquiry into the start of the race where Bayern moved to the inside at the start, in front of favorite Shared Belief. Controversy erupted over the question of whether Garcia's mount should have been disqualified for interference in the first few feet.

Year-end charts

References

1984 births
Living people
American jockeys
Mexican emigrants to the United States
American sportspeople of Mexican descent
Sportspeople from Veracruz